Safety and Health in Mines Convention, 1995 is  an International Labour Organization Convention. It was adopted at the 82nd International Labour Conference (ILC) of the International Labour Organization (ILO). The ILO is an agency under the United Nations that deals with international labor issues while promoting workers rights and opportunities. One of ILO's goals is to hold annual labor conventions to create legally binding contracts for participating nations to ratify. During the Safety and Health in Mines Convention (C176), it was recognized that there are inherent hazards in the mining workplace, and a need for a convention was mandatory.

The outcome of the Convention is that miner's health and safety is upheld and monitored through various actions involving the mining workplace. The responsible parties would be the government and employer of the countries that ratified the Convention. The laws outlined in the Convention ensure the health and safety of miners. The ILO adopted the Convention on June 22, 1995.

As of the end of 2015, 31 nations have ratified the Convention. The ILO requires any nation that ratifies a convention to be legally bound to its rules. Because ratifying the convention is optional, many prominent mining nations (including those notorious for mining incidents) have chosen not too participate.

It was established in 1995, with the preamble stating:
Recognizing that it is desirable to prevent any fatalities, injuries or ill health affecting workers or members of the public, or damage to the environment arising from mining operations, and

Having regard to the need for cooperation between the International Labour Organization, the World Health Organization, the International Atomic Energy Agency and other relevant institutions and noting the relevant instruments, codes of practice, codes and guidelines issued by these organizations, and

Having decided upon the adoption of certain proposals with regard to safety and health in mines, ...

The need for international mining regulation

Due to the hazardous conditions of the mining workplace, the Governing Body of the ILO recognized the need for a convention regarding the health and safety of miners. The ILO wanted to prevent fatalities, injuries and environmental damage as a result of mining.

Hazards in the mining industry

Mining safety has always been a large issue in the overall working industry as numerous fatalities occur each year. As a result of the workplace being underground, the threat of harmful gases being trapped in the workplace is present. Additionally, if any miner were to become trapped due to a cave-in, the extraction process can be extremely difficult and hazardous. There is also a risk of having a secondary collapse since the necessary infrastructure to support the new topography would not be in place after an initial collapse.  This would result in additional trapped miners and rescue workers. Since miners are trapped in pockets of rock, the risk of an explosion and oxygen deprivation is high.

As of 2001, more than 30 million people were employed in the mining industry. Despite that being only 1% of the world's workforce, mining holds over 8% of workplace fatalities. These statistics concerned the ILO, forcing them to hold a convention in order to decrease these statistics.

Relevant pre-exiting conventions

Before the Safety and Health in Mines Convention, there were numerous other conventions that were slightly relevant to health and safety in the mines such as The Safety and Health in Construction Convention and Recommendation, The Prevention of Major Industrial Accidents Convention and Recommendation, and The Medical Examination of Young Persons (Underground Work) Convention. However, despite the many conventions that were relevant, there were not enough laws and conditions specifically laid out for miner's health and safety. Therefore, the Safety and Health in Mines Convention was created.

The Convention
The document consists of 24 articles contained within 5 parts, preceded by a preamble.

Preamble: Recognizes the dangerous conditions in the world's mines, and notes multiple conventions that contain relevant laws in context with miners health and safety. 
Part 1: Definitions. One article states a clear definition for the terms mine and employer.   
Part 2: Scope and Means of Application. Four articles lay out who is responsible for upholding the Convention in ratifying countries. 
Part 3: Preventative and Protective Measures At The Mine. This is divided into three sections, discussing the employers and workers duty to safety and health in mines. 
Section A: Responsibilities of Employers. Seven articles state what the employer must do to minimize hazards and what to do in the event of one. 
Section B: Rights And Duties of Workers and Their Representatives. Two articles discuss workers rights and their duty to comply with safety regulations.
Section C: Cooperation. One article states the responsibility that miners and their employers have to work together to achieve health and safety in mines. 
Part 4: Implementation. One article discusses the government's requirement to provide inspection services and institute penalties for non-complying mines. 
Part 5: Final Provisions. Eight articles describe the legality of ratifying the Convention, as well as how to denounce it.

Denouncing the Convention
In Article 19 of Part 5, the process of denouncing the Convention is laid out. Countries are allowed to denounce the Convention only under certain circumstances. The article states that a country may denounce the Convention if they wish, only ten years after the Convention first came into force (in 1998). Therefore, in 2008 it was possible for any ratifying countries to eliminate the Convention and subsequently drop their enforcement of its laws. This would result in a major loss of support for miner's health and safety, and even basic rights. As a result, no countries have yet to denounce the Convention.

United States ratification
The 42nd President of The United States, Bill Clinton, signed the Convention on January 5, 2001 with guidance from the Secretary of Labor, Alexis Herman. The United States was the 16th country to ratify the Convention. The United States ratification of the Convention showed its international support for miners who work in hazardous conditions.

United States mining regulation prior to the Convention

Since the Convention contains laws that are enforceable by the government, the United States would be held accountable for all of the laws contained within it. However, the United States already enforces many laws relevant to the Convention. The Department of Labor has a division applicable to miners. This division, The Mine Safety and Health Administration (MSHA), is an agency that since 1977 has a mission to promote a safe and healthy workplace for miners by preventing injury and disease. The main method of doing this is by enforcing the Federal Mine Safety and Health Act of 1977, known as the Mine Act. The Mine Act sets various standards intended to reduce fatal accidents and to minimize health hazards in an already dangerous occupation. Having the MSHA inspect every American mine accomplishes a part of the Mine Act. In addition, the MSHA handles all accident reporting and safety issues from miners. The disease black lung, which largely affects miners, is being worked on by the MSHA to have it diminished in the United States. Similarly, the laws outlined in the Convention are aimed at lowering the number of individuals with disease obtained from the mining workplace.

Overlap with The Mine Act
As a result of the already implemented MSHA and the Mine Act in the United States, it was not clear whether or not the Convention ratification would make a large impact in the various mining health and safety laws. A tripartite panel consisting of representatives covering American government, labor and business was held. They compared the laws from the Convention and the laws set in place by the Mine Safety and Health Act of 1977. They concluded that the Convention could be signed by the president and ratified without the introduction of any new laws. This was due to the MSHA already enforcing all of the laws stated within the Convention.

Bill Clinton signing the Convention in 2001
Even though the ratification would not introduce any new laws, Bill Clinton signed the Convention in 2001. The reason for the ratification was a political and economic strategy. The United States had an interest in holding other countries accountable for miner's health and safety. By ratifying the Convention, the United States could reach out to other countries that have ratified it for failing to comply. If the United States had not ratified the Convention, it would be difficult to task other countries for failure to enforce the applicable laws.
 In addition to holding other nations accountable, the ratification would make the United States mining industry more competitive in the global economy. For example, if a coal buyer were only interested in doing business with mines that had the Convention signed, the United States would be at a loss without having it ratified.

Turkey's ratification

Soma mine disaster
At least 301 miners were killed in Soma, Turkey after an explosion sent poisonous gasses throughout the mine. More than 100 workers survived the explosion and subsequent gas, but were killed as a result of the mine collapsing onto them. Backlash against the government and the mine operator was strong and negligence investigations ensued. The general manager and the operations manager were held on suspicion of neglect, which caused numerous deaths. During the Soma disaster, a commission from the International Labor Organization was sent to discuss miner's health and safety with Turkish officials. The Turkish Labor minister, Faruk Celik, claimed that strict laws were already in place in Turkey. In addition, Turkey claimed to be in full compliance with European Union standards and had laws even more advanced than the ILO Convention.

IndustriALL push for ratification
IndustriALL, a global union that represents 50 million workers from 146 countries, wanted Turkey to swiftly ratify the Convention following the Soma disaster. One of their goals as a global union is to make the worlds mines safer. They claim that the best way to accomplish this is by having countries ratify the Convention and fully implement the laws and safety regulations contained within it. In addition, they state that the first priority of mining is to promote the safety and well being of miners. By favoring profit first, it should be considered criminal behavior that should be intolerable.

Turkish Parliament approves the Convention
Following the Soma disaster, debates occurred in Turkey as to whether or not the government was protecting its miners from disasters like this. Turkey was largely hesitant to begin ratification processes due to employer backlash of the cost to uphold to the Conventions rules and regulations. In the end, the Turkish Parliament's General Assembly on December 4, 2014 decided to formally adopt the Convention. Turkey notice of ratification of the treaty was deposited on 23 March 2015.

However, this has not been a perfect resolution. Many employers are unable to cover the cost of the resulting changes. As a result, many companies have been forced to lay off workers and shut down mines.

Preventing black lung disease

Pneumoconiosis, also known as black lung, is a fatal health illness present in the mining industry caused by prolonged exposure to mine dust. In the United States, black lung has caused 76,000 deaths since 1968. So far, 45 billion dollars have been spent in federal compensation towards miners and their dependents in the United States. Despite the large economic and death toll, black lung is entirely preventable. A mine that is equipped with good ventilation and newer tools is at a much lower (or nonexistent) risk for miners contracting black lung.

The risk of black lung in The United States has been nearly eliminated today. On the other hand, China (which has yet to ratify the Convention) had a total of 750,000 cases in 2013. That number is likely larger, but reporting is much less common in smaller Chinese mines. Ventilation, replacing dusty and hazardous air with fresh air, is the best way to prevent miners from contracting black lung.

Article 7 of the Convention requires that employers take measures to minimize the risk of disease. This includes having good ventilation in all locations of the mine in which miners come in contact with. The Convention also requires that the working environment is monitored for hazards that can induce disease. Finally, article 5 requires that countries publish statistics on occupational disease (included black lung).

Issues with the Convention
The goal of the Convention is to create a standard that can be used for any ratifying nations to promote the health and safety of miners. It supports the notion for countries to create the proper agencies to regulate the safety and health of miner's and implement standards. However, many prominent mining countries have yet to ratify the Convention. In addition, many ratifying nations differ in the amount of effort put into the relevant agencies.

Currently there are five main developed countries that are prominent in the mining industry. Only two of these five have ratified the Convention (The United States and Germany). There are a number of developing nations that also largely partake in mining. Despite this, only a fraction have signed the Convention. China, the world's leading coal producer, has yet to ratify the Convention. China also has the most dangerous track record of miner's health and safety (based on number of fatalities).

Apart from the countries that haven't ratified it, the effectiveness of the Convention relies on the strictness of the government. The ratifying nations are ultimately responsible for creating the relevant agencies and enforcing the standards laid out in the Convention.

European Union strengthening of the Convention
In 2008, the European Commission released a Recommendation for all EU members to ratify recent conventions from the ILO, including Convention 176. Similar to the United States, many EU member States have laws already in place that would match or in some cases surpass the laws laid out in the Convention. However, the Recommendations laid out by the Commission did not just ask for the ratification of the various conventions. The Commission recognized the notion that governments can ratify, yet not enforce the Convention fully. Therefore, it asked for the conventions rules to be strengthened and made certain that a supervisory system was in place to monitor the effectiveness of the conventions enforcement. The Recommendation was released despite opposition from some EU nations claiming that the funding to the ILO should be lowered or in some cases dropped.

Ukrainian project related to the Convention 

The ILO project in Ukraine was implemented between 1 May 2017 and 31 March 2020. It aimed to increase mine safety and the health of miners by introducing and enhancing modern occupational safety and health (OSH) policies. Given its policy implications, the project has increased the social partners' awareness of the need to take steps to improve occupational safety, to prevent work accidents and the full implementation of health protection measures.

Ratifications

As of November 2022, 34 countries have ratified the convention.

External links 
Text.
Ratifications.

References

International Labour Organization conventions
Occupational safety and health treaties
Treaties entered into force in 1998
Treaties concluded in 1995
Treaties of Albania
Treaties of Armenia
Treaties of Austria
Treaties of Brazil
Treaties of Belgium
Treaties of Bosnia and Herzegovina
Treaties of Botswana
Treaties of the Czech Republic
Treaties of Finland
Treaties of Germany
Treaties of Ireland
Treaties of Lebanon
Treaties of Luxembourg
Treaties of Mongolia
Treaties of Morocco
Treaties of Norway
Treaties of Peru
Treaties of the Philippines
Treaties of Poland
Treaties of Portugal
Treaties of Russia
Treaties of Slovakia
Treaties of South Africa
Treaties of Spain
Treaties of Sweden
Treaties of Turkey
Treaties of Ukraine
Treaties of the United States
Treaties of Uruguay
Treaties of Zambia
Treaties of Zimbabwe
Mining treaties
Mine safety
1995 in labor relations